The 2022–23 Serie B de México season is part of the third-tier football league of Mexico. The tournament began on 26 August 2022 and will finish in May 2023.

Offseason Changes
On May 21, 2022 Aguacateros CDU was promoted to Serie A de México.
On June 1, 2022 Chilpancingo was promoted from Liga TDP.
On July 1, 2022 Cañoneros and Mazorqueros were relocated from Serie A de México.
On July 1, 2022 Pioneros de Cancún and Zitácuaro joined the league after one–year hiatus.
On July 1, 2022 Atlético Angelópolis and T'hó Mayas joined the league as expansion teams.
On August 10, 2022 Lobos Huerta F.C. declined their Liga Premier participation for 2022–23 season to participate in the Liga de Balompié Mexicano.
C.D. Cuautla and Guerreros de Xico were put on hiatus.

Teams information

Teams 
{{Location map+ |Mexico |width=500|float=left |caption=Location of teams in the 2022–23 Serie B|places=

Torneo Apertura

Standings

Positions by Round

Results

Regular Season statistics

Top goalscorers
Players sorted first by goals scored, then by last name.

Source:Liga Premier FMF

Hat-tricks

(H) – Home ; (A) – Away

Attendance

Per team

Highest and lowest

Source: Liga Premier FMF

Liguilla
The best team of the regular season qualifies directly to the semifinals and the teams placed between the second and the seventh place qualify for the reclassification round (Repechaje). In the reclassification round, a single game will be played in the field of the best seeded team, the winner will advance to the semifinals, if there is a tie between both teams at the end of regular time, a penalty shoot-out will be held to define the winner. In the semifinals, if the two teams are tied on aggregate the higher seeded team advances. In the final, if the two teams are tied after both legs, the match goes to extra time and, if necessary, a penalty shoot-out.

Reclassification 
The matches were played on 28 and 29 October

|}

Matches

Bracket

Semi–finals
The first legs were on 2 November, and the second legs will be played on 5 November 2022.

First leg

Second leg

Final
The first leg was played on 9 November, and the second leg was played on 12 November 2022.

First leg

Second leg

Torneo Clausura
The Torneo Clausura began on 7 January 2023.

Standings

Positions by Round

Results

Regular Season statistics

Top goalscorers
Players sorted first by goals scored, then by last name.

Source:Liga Premier FMF

Hat-tricks

(H) – Home ; (A) – Away

Attendance

Per team

Highest and lowest

Source: Liga Premier FMF

Liguilla
The best team of the regular season qualifies directly to the semifinals and the teams placed between the second and the seventh place qualify for the reclassification round (Repechaje). In the reclassification round, a single game will be played in the field of the best seeded team, the winner will advance to the semifinals, if there is a tie between both teams at the end of regular time, a penalty shoot-out will be held to define the winner. In the semifinals, if the two teams are tied on aggregate the higher seeded team advances. In the final, if the two teams are tied after both legs, the match goes to extra time and, if necessary, a penalty shoot-out.

Reclassification 
The matches will be played on 24, 25 and 26 March 2023

|}

Matches

Bracket

Semi-finals
The first legs will be played on 31 March, 1 or 2 April, and the second legs will be played on 7, 8 or 9 April 2023.

Coefficient table 

Last updated: March 19, 2023 Source: Liga Premier FMFP = Position; G = Games played; Pts = Points; Pts/G = Ratio of points to games played; GD = Goal difference

Promotion Final
The Promotion Final is a series of matches played by the champions of the tournaments Apertura and Clausura, the game is played to determine the winning team of the promotion to Liga Premier – Serie A, as long as the winning team meets the league requirements. 

The first leg will be played on 30 April 2023, and the second leg will be played on 7 May 2023.

See also 
2022–23 Liga MX season
2022–23 Liga de Expansión MX season
2022–23 Serie A de México season
2022–23 Liga TDP season
2023 Copa Conecta

References

External links
 Official website of Liga Premier FMF

1